Lisa Barbuscia (born June 18, 1971), also known as Lisa B, is an American model, singer and actress. She is known for small roles in a number of films, including Bridget Jones's Diary, Highlander: Endgame, and Almost Heroes.

Music career 
She released her debut EP Telling Tales in 2004, and sang the song Adore You for the 2001 film Kiss of the Dragon.

At 19 she signed a recording contract with Pete Tong at London Records, and recorded with the producer, Paul Oakenfold. She released three singles, "Glam", "Fascinated" and "You & Me", all of which reached the UK Singles Chart.

Personal life
Barbuscia is married to UK-based property developer Anton Bilton, a founder of Raven Property Group. They have three sons, Orlando, Noah, and Gabriel, and homes in London and at Tyringham Hall in Buckinghamshire.

She participated in the PETA's campaign "Leave Wildlife out of Your Wardrobe".

Filmography

References

External links

American film actresses
Female models from New York (state)
American women pop singers
1971 births
Living people
Fiorello H. LaGuardia High School alumni
Actresses from New York City
Musicians from Brooklyn
Models from New York City
21st-century American women singers